Marion Hosbein (born January 1, 1927) is a former All-American Girls Professional Baseball League player. Listed at 5' 8", 138 lb., she batted and threw right handed.

Born in Coloma, Michigan, Marion Hosbein played at outfield in less of ten games for the South Bend Blue Sox in 1954, during what turned out to be the league's final season.

Afterwards, Hosbein returned home and worked as a letter carrier for the U.S. Postal Service. Following her retirement, she moved to Kalamazoo, Michigan, where she was active in social activities.

In 1988, Marion Hosbein received further recognition when she became part of Women in Baseball, a permanent display based at the Baseball Hall of Fame and Museum in Cooperstown, New York which was unveiled to honor the entire All-American Girls Professional Baseball League.

Sources

1927 births
Living people
All-American Girls Professional Baseball League players
South Bend Blue Sox players
Baseball players from Michigan
People from Berrien County, Michigan
21st-century American women